Bestwood Colliery railway station was a former station on the Great Northern Railway Nottingham to Shirebrook line.

References

Disused railway stations in Nottinghamshire
Railway stations in Great Britain opened in 1882
Railway stations in Great Britain closed in 1931
Former Great Northern Railway stations
Gedling